Teillay is a commune in the Ille-et-Vilaine department in Brittany in northwestern France.

Geography
The Brutz forms all of the commune's eastern border, then flows into the Semnon, which forms part of its northeastern border.

Population
Inhabitants of Teillay are called Teillacois in French.

See also
Tombe à la fille
Communes of the Ille-et-Vilaine department

References

External links

Mayors of Ille-et-Vilaine Association 

Communes of Ille-et-Vilaine